Harlis is a ghost town in Pine County, in the U.S. state of Minnesota.

History
A post office called Harlis was established in 1914, and remained in operation until 1932. Harlis had a depot on the Soo Railroad.

References

Geography of Pine County, Minnesota
Ghost towns in Minnesota